Bombus sylvarum, the shrill carder bee or knapweed carder-bee,  is a species of bumblebee with a wide distribution across Europe, east to the Ural Mountains, and north to Great Britain, Ireland, and southern Scandinavia.

Description
It is mostly pale yellowish in colour with a black band across the thorax, two black bands across the abdomen, and an orange tip to the abdomen. It flies rapidly and queens produce a high-pitched buzz.

Behaviour
The flight period lasts from about April to September. The queen bee emerges from hibernation in the spring. She makes a nest on or slightly below the surface of the ground among open vegetation. An old mouse or vole nest may be used. By summer, the nest may contain around 100 worker bees.

It occurs in herb-rich grassland where it feeds on nectar and pollen from a variety of flowers, especially ones that are complex or have long corollae. Important food plants include knapweed, woundwort, clover, vetch, red bartsia, and narrow-leaved bird's-foot trefoil.

Status and conservation
It is threatened by habitat loss and intensification of agriculture and is declining in numbers across Europe. In the United Kingdom, it was common until the early 20th century, but is now restricted to a few small areas in southern England and south Wales. The species is included in the United Kingdom Biodiversity Action Plan. It is also an endangered species in Ireland.

Gallery

References

ARKive. Shrill carder bee  (Bombus sylvarum). Accessed 18 December 2008.
Edwards, Mike & Martin Jenner (2005) Field Guide to the Bumblebees of Great Britain & Ireland, Ocelli. .

External links
UKBAP: Shrill Carder Bee (Bombus sylvarum)

Bumblebees
Hymenoptera of Europe
Insects described in 1761
Taxa named by Carl Linnaeus